Jamie Stoddard (born December 29, 1977) is a former professional Canadian football wide receiver. He was signed by the Winnipeg Blue Bombers as an undrafted free agent in 2000. He played CIS Football at Alberta. Jamie now teaches business at Steveston-London Secondary School.

Statistics

References

External links
Winnipeg Blue Bombers bio

1977 births
Alberta Golden Bears football players
Canadian football wide receivers
Living people
People from Richmond, British Columbia
Players of Canadian football from British Columbia
Winnipeg Blue Bombers players